The 1996 United States Olympic trials for track and field were held at Centennial Olympic Stadium in Atlanta, Georgia. This is the same venue as would be used for the 1996 Summer Olympics.  This was effectively the new stadium's test run.  The stadium was converted into what is now used for baseball as Turner Field.  Organised by USA Track and Field, the ten-day competition lasted from June 14 until June 23 and served as the national championships in track and field for the United States.  The men's Marathon trials were held February 17 in Charlotte, North Carolina.

The results of the event determined qualification for the American Olympic team at the 1996 Summer Olympics, held in the same stadium. Provided they had achieved the Olympic "A" standard, the top three athletes gained a place on the Olympic team. In the event that a leading athlete did not hold an "A" standard, or an athlete withdrew, the next highest finishing athlete with an "A" standard was selected instead.

Medal summary
Key:
.

Men

Men track events

Men field events

Women

Women track events

Women field events

References

Results
Full Results. USATF. Retrieved on 2015-10-23.

External links
Official webpage at USATF

USA Outdoor Track and Field Championships
US Olympic Trials
Track, Outdoor
United States Summer Olympics Trials
United States Olympic Trials (track and field)
Track and field in California